Mixiuhca is a metro station along Line 9 of the Mexico City Metro serving the Jardín Balbuena and Colonia Magdalena Mixiuhca districts in the Venustiano Carranza borough of Mexico City, Mexico.

The station's icon is a silhouette of a woman holding a newborn baby. In the Nahuatl language mixiuhca means "place of births". The origin of this name comes from one of the Aztecs' migration stories. When the Aztecs first came to the Valley of Mexico, they lived for a long time in a place called Tizapan. However, they were violently expelled from there. Legend states that they ran out to the surrounding swamps using their shields and spears as rafts for the women and children. They ran across three places: Mexicaltzingo, Iztacalco and Temazcaltitlán, and precisely there, in that last place, one of the women gave birth to a child.  From then on, the name of that place became Mixiuhca.

The station was opened on 26 August 1987. From 23 April to 21 June 2020, the station was temporarily closed due to the COVID-19 pandemic in Mexico.

Ridership

Gallery

References

External links 

Mixiuhca
Railway stations opened in 1987
1987 establishments in Mexico
Mexico City Metro stations in Venustiano Carranza, Mexico City